Tuk Smith and The Restless Hearts is an American rock band from Nashville founded and fronted by former Biters frontman Tuk Smith from Atlanta. The band released their debut single, "What Kinda Love," on January 10, 2020, and were also added as an opening act for The Stadium Tour with Def Leppard and Mötley Crüe on the same day. Their debut album, Lookin' For Love, Ready For War, was due to be released later in 2020 through Better Noise. However, the band and label parted ways after the COVID-19 pandemic forced the Stadium Tour and album release to be delayed, and the album was shelved. They have since signed with new label, Music Recording Group (MRG), and are set to release their new debut album, Ballad of a Misspent Youth, in late 2022.

Members 

 Tuk Smith – vocals, guitar
 Ricky Dover Jr. – guitar
 Shane Rickerson – bass
 Nigel Dupree – drums

Discography

Singles

EPs

References

External links 
 Official website

Rock music groups from Georgia (U.S. state)
Rock music groups from Tennessee
Musical groups from Nashville, Tennessee